David O'Brien (October 1, 1937 – June 14, 1989) was an American actor best known for his long-running role as Dr. Steve Aldrich on the NBC daytime serial The Doctors (1967–82).

Career
Born in the Chicago suburb of Glencoe, O'Brien also had roles on numerous other soap operas, including The Secret Storm, the primetime Our Private World, Search for Tomorrow, Ryan's Hope, and Loving.

His character on The Secret Storm was Kip Rysdale, who was the husband of the heroine of that show, Amy Ames, played by actress Jada Rowland. In 1976, the two actors were reunited when Rowland joined the cast of The Doctors as the second Carolee Aldrich, the wife of O'Brien's character.

One of his later roles was as Dr. Alan Glaser on Another World (1986–87). The role started out as that of a seemingly good doctor, but in the end, the good doctor was revealed to be the "Sin Stalker," responsible for killing off several supporting characters on the show.

Other television shows O'Brien starred in include The Adams Chronicles (TV mini series), The United States Steel Hour, The Heiress (TV Movie), The Cosby Show and Spenser: For Hire (as recurring character Tom Flaherty). He also appeared in the movie Arthur 2: On the Rocks.

Death
O'Brien died in Manhattan on June 14, 1989 from acquired immune deficiency syndrome (AIDS) complications.  His death notice in The New York Times stated that he died on June 15 and was survived by a sister and a nephew.

Filmography

References

External links

1989 deaths
AIDS-related deaths in New York (state)
American male soap opera actors
American male television actors
People from Glencoe, Illinois
Male actors from Chicago
1937 births
20th-century American male actors